No Drums, No Bugles is a 1972 American drama film written, produced and directed by Clyde Ware. The film stars Martin Sheen, Davey Davison, Rod McCary and Denine Terry. The film was released on February 23, 1972, by Cinerama Releasing Corporation.

Plot

Cast             
Martin Sheen as Ashby Gatrell
Davey Davison as Callie Gatrell
Rod McCary as Lieutenant
Denine Terry as Sarah
Carmen Costi as Foxhunter
Ray Marsh as Foxhunter
Frank Stubock as Foxhunter
Bob Wagner as Foxhunter
Eeward Underwood as Foxhunter

References

External links
 

1972 films
1972 directorial debut films
1972 drama films
American Civil War films
American drama films
Anti-war films
Cinerama Releasing Corporation films
Films directed by Clyde Ware
Films set in West Virginia
Films shot in West Virginia
1970s English-language films
1970s American films